Stella Luz Alabastro Quimbo ( Alabastro; born November 23, 1969) is a Filipino economist, academic, and politician who has served as the representative for Marikina's 2nd congressional district since 2019, as a member of the Liberal Party. She previously served as a commissioner of the Philippine Competition Commission from 2016 up until her resignation in 2019.

Early life
Quimbo was born on November 23, 1963 to Estrella Alabastro, who would serve as a secretary of science and technology under the Arroyo administration.

Academia

Quimbo graduated with a Bachelor of Science in Economics summa cum laude (1991), Master of Arts in Economics (1993), and Doctor of Philosophy in Economics (2000) from the University of the Philippines Diliman. She was a professor and a former department chairperson of the University of the Philippines School of Economics. From 2011 to 2013, Quimbo was appointed to the rank of full professor into the Prince Clause Professorial Chair at the Erasmus University Rotterdam in Netherlands. She was the first Southeast Asian to hold the position. Her research portfolio focuses on the field of health economics, industrial organization, microeconomics, education, poverty, and public policy.

Political career
Quimbo is a founding appointed commissioner of the Philippine Competition Commission, who served the agency from 2016 until 2019.

Congressional career (2019–present) 
In 2019, Quimbo was elected to represent the second district of Marikina in the House of Representatives, defeating independents Eugene de Vera and Mauro Arce to succeed her husband, Miro Quimbo, as the district's representative after he was term-limited.

Quimbo was a member of a technical working group tasked to study the franchise renewal of ABS-CBN, the largest broadcaster in the Philippines. She was the lone dissenter against the decision of the other two members Pablo John Garcia (Cebu–3rd) and Xavier Jesus Romualdo (Camiguin) to disapprove the application of ABS-CBN for another franchise.

Quimbo is the Vice Chairperson of the Committee on Appropriations in the 19th Congress.

Controversy 
Eugene de Vera lodged a quo warranto petition against Quimbo following the 2019 elections. De Vera claimed that Quimbo was ineligible for the position, citing Section 8 of Republic Act No. 10667 or the Philippine Competition Act, which prohibited former commissioners of the Philippine Competition Commission to run for public office during their tenure and the two-year period following their exit from the office. De Vera also claimed that Quimbo did not disclose her former commissionership by stating that she was a teacher in her certificate of candidacy. Beng Sardillo, Quimbo's legal counsel, had derided as de Vera's interpretation of the act as "patently self-serving, erroneous, and has no legal basis". The petition remains pending before the House of Representatives Electoral Tribunal (HRET).

Personal life 
She is married to lawyer and former representative Miro Quimbo. They have four children.

References

Living people
1969 births
20th-century Filipino economists
Academic staff of the University of the Philippines
Women members of the House of Representatives of the Philippines
Members of the House of Representatives of the Philippines from Marikina
Women economists
Academic staff of Erasmus University Rotterdam
University of the Philippines Diliman alumni
Politicians from Manila
Liberal Party (Philippines) politicians
Brown University alumni
21st-century Filipino economists